The List of awards and nominations received by Flori Mumajesi refers to the awards and nominations which were received by Albanian composer, singer and songwriter Flori Mumajesi.

Balkan Music Awards 

The Balkan Music Awards is an award ceremony organized by Balkanika TV celebrating the most successful in music from the Balkan countries. Flori has won three awards from four nominations.

Kënga Magjike 
 
Kënga Magjike is an annual competition, which has been broadcast every year since its debut in 1999, and the second longest-running television competition in Albania. Flori has participated seven times since its debut in 2003 and has won several awards. His first victory as a singer was in 2018 though he was additionally the composer of the winning entries "Hape Vetën" by Aurela Gaçe in 2007 and "Ma Zgjat Dorën" by Eneda Tarifa in the following 2019.

award do not exist

Top Fest 

|-
||2011
||"Tallava"
|Internet Prize
|
|}
 

|-
|rowspan="2"|2016
|rowspan="2"|"Gone Girl (ft 2po2)"
|Collaboration of the Year
|
|-
|Song of the Year
|
|-
||2016
||"Flori Mumajesi"
|Male Artist of the Year
|
|}

Videofest 

|-
|rowspan="4"|2007
|rowspan="4"|"Flori feat. Tingulli 3'nt. - Njëherë në jetë"
|Best R&B Video
|
|-
|Best Video / First Prize
|
|-
|Best Editing
|
|-
|Best Production
|
|-
|rowspan="2"|2012
|rowspan="2"|"Flori ft. Albatrit Muqiqi & Noga – Tequila Vava"
|The most views video on YouTube
|
|-
|Best Pop Folk Video
|
|-
|rowspan="5"|2013
|rowspan="5"|"Pa jete"
|Best Video / First Prize
|
|-
|Best Male 
|
|-
|Best Ballad
|
|-
|Best Director
|
|-
|Best Performance
|
|-
||2014
||"Flori Ft. Kaos - Lule Lule"
|Best Director
|
|}

Zhurma Show Awards 

|-
||2012
||"Me zemer"
|Best Pop
|
|-
||2013
||"Pa jete"
|Best Performer
|
|-
||2014
||"Ke"
|Best Dance
|
|-
||2014
||"Ta boja me drita"
|Best Pop
|
|-
||2015
||"Flori Mumajesi ft. Dj Vicky- Nallane"
|Best Pop
|
|}

References 

Awards
Mumajesi, Flori